Mirko Antonucci (born 11 March 1999) is an Italian professional footballer who plays as a winger for  club Cittadella.

Professional career

Roma
Antonucci joined Roma at the age of 13, after being scouted by their legendary former player and coach Bruno Conti. He signed his first professional contract with the team on 28 September 2017. He made his professional debut for Roma in a 1–1 Serie A tie with Sampdoria on 24 January 2018, and he assisted Edin Džeko for his side's late equalizer. On 2 May, he made his European debut against Liverpool in a Champions League semi-final.

Loan to Pescara
On 19 July 2018, Antonucci signed to Pescara on loan until 30 June 2019.

Loan to Vitória de Setúbal
On 30 January 2020, he joined Vitória de Setúbal on loan until the end of 2019–20 season. He had his loan terminated due to posting TikTok videos with him dancing, after a loss against Boavista.

Loan to Salernitana
After appearing on the bench for Roma in the first three games of the 2020–21 Serie A season, on 5 October 2020 he joined Salernitana on loan.

Cittadella
On 30 July 2021, it was announced that Antonucci had joined Serie B club Cittadella on a permanent basis.

Career statistics

Club

References

External links
 
 
 Serie A Profile
 FIGC Profile

1999 births
Living people
Footballers from Rome
Italian footballers
Italian expatriate footballers
Italy youth international footballers
A.S. Roma players
Delfino Pescara 1936 players
Vitória F.C. players
U.S. Salernitana 1919 players
A.S. Cittadella players
Serie A players
Serie B players
Primeira Liga players
Association football wingers
Association football forwards
Italian expatriate sportspeople in Portugal
Expatriate footballers in Portugal